Rail News may refer to:

Railnews, a national newspaper for the British rail industry
Rail News (South Australian Railways)
RailNews, a defunct American railway magazine, previously named Pacific RailNews